William Beck (October 9, 1894 – May 14, 1975) was an American cyclist. He competed in three events at the 1920 Summer Olympics.

References

External links
 

1894 births
1975 deaths
American male cyclists
Olympic cyclists of the United States
Cyclists at the 1920 Summer Olympics
Sportspeople from Newark, New Jersey